Alican Önlü (born 27 December 1967, Nazimye, Turkey) is a politician of the Peoples Democratic Party (HDP) and a member of the Grand National Assembly of Turkey. Throughout his political career he was a politician in a variety of parties such as the Democracy Party (DEP) and the Democratic Society Party (DTP).

Political career 
Önlü is a Kurdish politician of the Alevi faith and has been active in several political parties. Beginning with the People's Labour Party (HEP) he later joined the DEP, the People's Labor Party (HEP), the People's Democracy Party (HADEP), then the Democratic Society Party (DTP) and the Democratic Regions Party (DBP) before he joined the HDP. He was active in the Istanbul branch for the HADEP and the Democratic People's Party (DEHAP) in Tunceli. In the parliamentary elections of June 2015 Önlü was elected to the Grand National Assembly of Turkey, representing Tunceli for the Peoples Democratic Party (HDP). He was relelected in the snap elections of November 2015 and also in June 2018.

Prosecution 
He was arrested in December 2016 and accused of being involved in the Kurdistan Communities Union (KCK) which Turkey sees as an extension of the Kurdistan Workers' Party (PKK). He was released in March 2017 pending trial. In a separate case, he was sentenced to one year and six months imprisonment for spreading propaganda for the PKK on terror related charges in February 2019. The KCK case was treated apart of the KCK mail trail and as of September 2019, the case was still ongoing. On the 17 March 2021, the State Prosecutor before the Court of Cassation of Turkey Bekir Şahin filed a lawsuit before the Constitutional Court demanding for Önlü and 686 other HDP politicians a five-year ban to engage in politics. The lawsuit was filed jointly with a request for a closure of the HDP due to the parties alleged organizational links with the PKK.

Personal life 
He is married and the father of two children.

References 

1967 births
Living people
Democratic Society Party politicians
People from Nazımiye
Politicians arrested in Turkey
People's Labor Party politicians
Democratic Regions Party politicians
Members of the 26th Parliament of Turkey
Members of the 27th Parliament of Turkey
Peoples' Democratic Party (Turkey) politicians
Members of the 25th Parliament of Turkey
Kurdish Alevis
Turkish Kurdish politicians